Bijarabin (also Romanized as Bījārābīn; also known as Bījārehbīn) is a village in Virmuni Rural District, in the Central District of Astara County, Gilan Province, Iran. At the 2006 census, its population was 1,052, in 275 families.

References 

Populated places in Astara County